Qezel Qaleh or Qazel Qaleh may refer to:
 Qezel Qaleh, East Azerbaijan
 Qezel Qaleh-ye Kuranlu, East Azerbaijan Province
 Qezel Qaleh-ye Musulanlu, East Azerbaijan Province
 Qezel Qaleh, Markazi
 Qezel Qaleh, Razavi Khorasan
 Qezel Qaleh-ye Bala, North Khorasan Province
 Qezel Qaleh-ye Pain, North Khorasan Province